Henry Lewellys Barker Wrong, CBE (20 April 1930 – 2 August 2017) was a Canadian-born arts administrator. He was the first director of the Barbican Centre from 1970 to 1990.

References 

1930 births
2017 deaths
Commanders of the Order of the British Empire
Canadian Commanders of the Order of the British Empire
Canadian arts administrators
British arts administrators
University of Toronto alumni